Jessica Elin Maria Landström (born 12 December 1984) is a former Swedish football forward who has represented the Sweden women's national football team at the 2008 Olympic Football Tournament, the 2009 UEFA Women's Championship and the 2011 FIFA Women's World Cup. At club level she has played for Damallsvenskan teams Djurgårdens IF, Hammarby IF DFF, Linköpings FC and Kopparbergs/Göteborg FC. She has also played for 1. FFC Frankfurt of Germany and Sky Blue FC of the United States.

Club career
After starting her career with four years at Djurgårdens, Landström played for Hammarby IF DFF as a forward from 2005–2007. A few weeks after her debut and first goal for the Swedish national team, she was signed by Linköpings FC to replace the departing Frida Östberg. The transfer multiplied her salary by nearly six times; when with Hammarby, she made about $500 a month, whereas she reportedly banked up to $3,000 playing for Linköpings. She intended that the transfer would help to secure her spot on the national squad for the 2008 Beijing Olympics.

Landström scored 11 goals in 17 games in 2008 and decided to stay with Linköpings for the 2009 season, in which the club collected a league and cup "double". She scored against Umeå in the 2–0 Swedish Cup final win.

In November 2009 Landström signed a professional contract with American WPS team Sky Blue FC. After starting three of nine appearances for Sky Blue, Landström negotiated a release and accepted a two-year contract from FFC Frankfurt in July 2010. She criticised the American club for a lack of leadership and expressed the hope that playing in Germany would provide better preparation for the 2011 FIFA Women's World Cup.

Landström agreed a deal to return to Djurgårdens in April 2012, but with Frankfurt still in the UEFA Women's Champions League, the German club insisted on her staying until the end of their season before she was eventually allowed to complete the move.

When Djurgårdens were relegated at the end of the 2012 season, Landström transferred to Kopparbergs/Göteborg FC. She was signed as a direct replacement for Christen Press, Göteborg's top goalscorer who had departed for Tyresö FF. After leaving Göteborg, Landström did not play in 2014 but was training with former club Hammarby ahead of the 2015 campaign.

International career
Landström's "dreams were crushed" when she was overlooked for the youth national teams, after finishing as top–scorer in a regional Under–15 tournament. She debuted for the senior Swedish national team against Denmark on 8 November 2007, starting at forward and scoring her first international goal in a 4–2 win. She had also played for the U21/23 national team.

She was included in coach Thomas Dennerby's squad for the 2008 Olympic Games. It was her first major championship and she wanted to learn from playing alongside first choice strikers Lotta Schelin and Victoria Sandell Svensson. Landström played in four games in China, and retained her place in the national squad for UEFA Women's Euro 2009, where she played twice.

At the 2011 FIFA Women's World Cup Landström scored the winning goal in the group stage win over Colombia, as Sweden reached the semi final. She featured as a substitute in Sweden's 3–1 defeat to eventual winners Japan in Frankfurt. Sweden secured third place by beating France 2–1 in Sinsheim, though Landström remained an unused substitute.

Landström was named as an alternate for the Sweden squad at the 2012 London Olympics but did not play.

Playing style
In signing Landström for Sky Blue FC, the American club's general manager Gerry Marrone said:

Personal life
Landström is lesbian and came out publicly in November 2008, to acknowledge the support she had received from her partner. Before turning professional, she had studied for a master's degree in mechanical engineering.

Honours

Club 

 Djurgårdens IF
 Damallsvenskan (2): 2003, 2004
 Svenska Cupen (1): 2004

 Linköpings FC
 Damallsvenskan (1): 2009
 Svenska Cupen (2): 2008, 2009
 Supercupen (1): 2009

 1. FFC Frankfurt
 German Cup (1): 2010–11

 Kopparbergs/Göteborg FC
 Supercupen (1): 2013

Individual 
 Swedish Newcomer of the Year (1): 2008

Footnotes

References

External links

Kopparbergs/Göteborg FC player profile 
Linköping FC player profile 
 
Lotta Schelin and Jessica Landström Interview

1984 births
Living people
2011 FIFA Women's World Cup players
Footballers at the 2008 Summer Olympics
Swedish LGBT sportspeople
Olympic footballers of Sweden
Swedish women's footballers
Sweden women's international footballers
Lesbian sportswomen
LGBT association football players
1. FFC Frankfurt players
Djurgårdens IF Fotboll (women) players
BK Häcken FF players
Hammarby Fotboll (women) players
Linköpings FC players
NJ/NY Gotham FC players
Swedish expatriate women's footballers
Expatriate women's footballers in Germany
Expatriate women's soccer players in the United States
Swedish expatriate sportspeople in Germany
Swedish expatriate sportspeople in the United States
Damallsvenskan players
Women's association football midfielders
Women's association football forwards
Women's Professional Soccer players